Seo Jung-hack is a South Korean baritone singer.

Career

1990s and 2000s
South Korean Baritone to Perform with the Metropolitan Opera Company (1997–98).

After graduating from Seoul National University, Jung-Hack Seo entered the Curtis Institute of Music.

He debuted with the San Francisco Opera in 1993 where he was the First Asian singer to win the Schwabache Family Award.

In 1996, Seo went on to win the Metropolitan Opera Competition and enter the Metropolitan Opera Young Artist Development Program.

In 1997, he performed the title role in "Ill Barbiere di Siviglia" and other programs with the Metropolitan Opera Company.

In 1997, he entered the Operalia, The World Opera Competition and placed second.

He has performed with numerous world class opera companies besides the Metropolitan Opera, such as the Wiener Staatsoper.  The Opera Company of Philadelphia, the Connecticut Grand Opra, Tulsa Opera, the Dallas Opera, The San Francisco Opera and the Opera of the Pacific.

He studied under In-Young Lee, Marlena Malas, Renata Scotto, Robert Merill.

2000s - present
2006 Don Carlo at Seoul Arts Center

2004 Oct. Lucia Di Lanmermoor at Seoul Arts Center

Performance in Japan
2010 June 11 "REINCARNAZIONE" Vol.3 Finale The Road To Music at Bunkamura Orchard Hall
performed with Tokyo Philharmony Orchestra, Conducted by Mr. Park Sang-Hyun
2009 July 17 Solo Concert "REINCARNAZIONE" Vol.2 l'Indicatore stradale poi l'amore  at Ginza Oji Hall
2009 July 14 Solo Concert "REINCARNAZIONE" Vol.2 l'Indicatore stradale poi l'amore  at Kyoto Concert Hall
2009 April 10 Solo Concert "REINCARNAZIONE" Vol.1 La Confession  at Ginza Oji Hall
2009 March 6  Solo Concert "REINCARNAZIONE" Prelude Svegliando  at Saloon Tezzerra
2008 March and May Gala Concert>br>
2004  December 19  "Beethoven No.9 At Tokorozawa"

Awards and distinctions

Recordings
The American Russian Youth Orchestra in Concert

Notes and references

METROPOLITAN OPERA NATIONAL COUNCIL WINNERS See 1996 Winner Seo, Jung-Hack　PDF Files 
Seoul National University Seoul National University
Seoul National University College of Music
Seoul Arts Center
The Licia Albanese-Puccini Foundation International Vocal Competition 1996　
Romeo et Juliette Role: Paris Dated on March 28, 1998 
Ill Barbiere di Siviglia Role: Fiorello (title role) Dated on Dec. 20, 1997 
1996 Met Competition.
Serch of Jung-Hack Seo News *Online&sp-i=1
Merola Opera 
New York Times Search ”Jung-Hack Seo”

External links
SEO MUSICA UNITA: The Official Web Site Korean & Japanese.
KBS Open concert: 
Operalia, The World Opera Competition
The American Russian Youth Orchestra in Concert 

Living people
Operatic baritones
20th-century South Korean male singers
South Korean opera singers
Curtis Institute of Music people
Winners of the Metropolitan Opera National Council Auditions
21st-century South Korean male singers
Year of birth missing (living people)
South Korean baritones